Michael Kemper Goodwin (April 28, 1939 – May 4, 2011) was an architect and politician in the Phoenix, Arizona area. He also served two terms in the Arizona House of Representatives in the 1970s.

Life and career
Goodwin was born April 28, 1939, to Kemper Goodwin and Mary 'Mickey' Goodwin. (Kemper Goodwin was a local architect, who designed two buildings which are now on the National Register of Historic Places in Arizona). He attended the University of Southern California graduating in 1963.

After graduation, Goodwin returned to Arizona and joined his father's firm. In 1966, he received his licence in architecture and was made senior partner. The firm then became known as Michael & Kemper Goodwin Ltd. He took over the firm after his father retired in 1975. In 1978, he was the youngest person ever to become a Fellow of the American Institute of Architects.

In 1969 Goodwin ran for his districts seat in the Arizona House of Representatives on the Republican ticket. He would go on to serve two terms in the House. In 1975 he ran for Secretary of State which he lost by a narrow margin to Wesley Bolin. Goodwin did all this while still maintaining his career as an architect.

His firm specialized in educational structures designing facilities for several school districts throughout Arizona. Many of these schools are still in use, however several have been demolished and replaced with new campuses.

He was also one of the first architects to experiment in green and sustainable building designs as well as efficiency of building design as seen in many of his educational and municipal buildings. Examples of his sustainable and efficiency ideas include the use of sloping glass, earth berms, solar energy, hexagonal structures framed in as parallelograms, light and body heat as heat sources, modular portable building elements, and rooftop parking.

In 1981 Goodwin and his family moved to Flagstaff, Arizona, at this time Goodwin began to phase himself out of architecture to represent this the firm was reorganized into Ahern, MacVittie, Hofmann & Goodwin, Ltd. Ultimately Goodwin's name would be doped and Ahern, MacVittie & Hofmann Ltd. would go on to design many more schools. He would however involve himself in real estate as a developer and keep the name Michael & Kemper Goodwin Ltd. when developing the Elks Run subdivision in Flagstaff. In 1995 Michael returned to Phoenix living in an adobe home on Camelback Mountain.

Goodwin died of pulmonary fibrosis on May 4, 2011 at the age of 72.

Major works
 Salt River Project Building, Tempe, Arizona (1966–1968 with Kemper Goodwin)
 Michael Goodwin Residence, Tempe, Arizona (1968–1969)
 Tempe Municipal Building (1966–1970 with Kemper Goodwin): this upside-down pyramid was designed to shade and cool itself
 Omaha Dome, Creighton University, Omaha, Nebraska (1968 unbuilt)
 Tempe Chamber of Commerce, Tempe, Arizona, (1970 unbuilt)
 Arizona Highway Employees Credit Union, Phoenix, Arizona (1971 with Kemper Goodwin)
 Paradise Valley Town Hall (1971–1975): the low slung earth berm surrounded building reflects the residential image of the town
 Scottsdale Medical Pavilion, Scottsdale, Arizona (1972–1976): wedge-shaped structure that uses roof of below floor as access to the above space
 First Federal Building, Tempe, Arizona (1973 unbuilt): used earth berms and innovative idea of rooftop parking
 Maricopa County Warehouse, Phoenix, Arizona (1974)
 Mercury Mine Bridge, Phoenix, Arizona (1975)
 St. Michael's Episcopal Church, Coolidge, Arizona (1976)
 Mill Avenue Shops, Tempe, Arizona (1977–1978): Goodwin advocated for the red brick sidewalks that are a pivotal part of the buildings character
 United Bank Building, Tempe, Arizona (1980 unbuilt)
 Paradise Valley Police Station (1980)
 Garden Showcase Apartments (now MarQ at 1st) Tempe, Arizona (1984)
 The Elk Run subdivision in Flagstaff, Arizona, among his few residential designs
 Yavapai County Health Building, Prescott, Arizona (1986): built using Goodwin's Sweet Little Unit (SLU) steel framed portable building system (Demolished)
 United States Post Office, Kayenta, Arizona (1988)
 United States Post Office, Prescott, Arizona (1989)

Schools 
Arizona State University
 Central Boiler Plant (1967 with Kemper Goodwin)
 Mathematics Building (now Wexler Hall) (1965–1968 with Kemper Goodwin)
 Bateman Physical Sciences Center (Physics and Geology Facility) (1973–1975)
 Bateman Physical Sciences Center (Chemistry Stores Building) (1979)
 Bateman Physical Sciences Center (Advanced Chemistry Building) (1982)

Tempe Union High School District
 Marcos de Niza High School (1971 with Kemper Goodwin): this work was considered a revolution in open space campus design
 Corona del Sol High School (1976): a very early design in solar technology
 Addition to McClintock High School (1976)

Tempe Elementary School District
 Evans Elementary School (1965 with Kemper Goodwin)
 Hudson Elementary School (1967 with Kemper Goodwin)
 Scales Elementary School (1968) (Demolished)
 Curry Elementary School (1968–1969)
 Connolly Middle School (1969–1972)
 Arredondo Elementary School (1972 with Kemper Goodwin)
 Frank Elementary School, Ronaldo & Elena Sanchez Activity Center (1973–1975) (Demolished)
 Nevitt Elementary School (1974): hexagonal shaped structures to form parallelogram shaped classrooms (Demolished)
 Bustoz Elementary School (1974): hexagonal shaped structures to form parallelogram shaped classrooms (now Bustoz Learning Center)
 Rover Elementary School (1976)
 Getz School (1979)

Kyrene School District
 Kyrene del Norte Elementary School (1973): hexagonal shaped structures form parallelogram shaped classrooms
 Addition to C. I. Waggoner Elementary School (1975)
 Kyrene de las Lomas Elementary School (1976) (Demolished)

Paradise Valley Unified School District
 Shea Middle School (1969–1971): Goodwin's first example of earth berms (Demolished)
 Indian Bend Elementary School (1972 with Kemper Goodwin)
 Desert Shadows Elementary School (1972 with Kemper Goodwin)
 Aerrowhead Elementary School (1973–1974): Goodwin's first example of hexagonal shaped structures that form parallelogram shaped classrooms
 Desert Shadows Middle School (1974)
 Mercury Mine Elementary School (1976)
 Liberty Elementary School (1976–1977): used light and body heat as a heat supply (Demolished)
 Additions to Paradise Valley High School (1976–1979)
 Multi-use Building Addition at Campo Bello Elementary School (1976)
 Multi-use Building Addition at Larkspur Elementary School (1978)
 Paradise Valley Portable Elementary Schools (1978–1979): Goodwin called it the "sweet little unit" (SLU) portable steel framed classrooms which were able to be expanded vertically or horizontally built around a permanent core. Aire Libre, Desert Springs, Sandpiper and Sweetwater Elementary Schools among others.
 Horizon High School (1978–1980): initial plan called for SLU method to be used, final product was a permanent structure of masonry, steel, and concrete with earth berms
 Sunrise Middle School (1980–1981): classroom buildings built using SLU method

Roosevelt Elementary School District
 Cafeteria addition at M.L. King Elementary School (1975)
 Auditorium addition at C.J. Jorgensen Elementary School (1975)
 C.O. Greenfield Elementary/Middle School (1977–1980)

Scottsdale Unified School District
 Cherokee Elementary School (1973–1974): hexagonal shaped structures form parallelogram shaped classrooms (Demolished)

Many other local elementary, middle, and high schools
 Safford High School, Safford, Arizona (1978–1981)
 Nogales High School, Nogales, Arizona (1979–1980)
 Morenci Junior/Senior High School, Morenci, Arizona (1979–1984)

References

Architects from Arizona
1939 births
2011 deaths